ʿAbd Allāh ibn ʿAmr ibn al-ʿĀṣ (died 684 CE/65 AH) was the son of Amr ibn al-As of Banu Sahm and was a companion of the Islamic prophet Muhammad. He was the author of "Al-Sahifah al-Sadiqah" ("The Truthful Script"), the first known hadith compilation document.  The document contained about one thousand of Muhammad's narrations.

Biography 
Abd Allah ibn Amr embraced Islam in the year 7 AH ( CE), a year before his father, Amr ibn al-As. Muhammad was said to have shown a preference for Abd Allah ibn 'Amr due to his knowledge. He was one of the first companions to write down the Hadith, after receiving permission from Muhammad to do so. 

Abd Allah witnessed some of the battles under Muhammad. He participated in the Battle of Siffin as he was obliged to follow his father in the ranks of Mu'awiya. He led the right wing of the army, though he did not take part in the actual fighting. He was said to have regretted his participation.

Abd Allah succeeded his father Amr as governor of Egypt for a few weeks in early 664 before Mu'awiya, who had become caliph in 661, appointed his own brother Utba ibn Abi Sufyan to the post.

Character 
Known as one of "four Abadillah" Faqīh, a group of companions which known for their Sharia expertize who shared same name which consisted of Ibn 'Amr himself, Abdullah ibn Umar, Abdullah ibn Masud, and Abdullah Ibn Abbas.

Abu Huraira said that Abd Allah ibn 'Amr was more knowledgeable than he was.

His work Al-Sahifah al-Sadiqah remained in his family and was used by his grandson 'Amr ibn Shu'ayb. Ahmad ibn Hanbal incorporated the whole of the work of Abd Allah ibn 'Amr in his voluminous book Musnad Ahmad ibn Hanbal thereby covering the missing Al-Sahifah al-Sadiqah which was written in the days of Muhammad.

References

Sources 

Year of birth unknown
684 deaths
Umayyad governors of Egypt
Sahabah hadith narrators